A partial lunar eclipse took place on Monday, June 15, 1992, the first of two lunar eclipses in 1992, the second being with a total lunar eclipse on Wednesday, December 9.

Visibility

Related eclipses

Eclipses of 1992 
 An annular solar eclipse (ascending node) on January 4.
 A partial lunar eclipse (ascending node) on June 15.
 A total solar eclipse (descending node) on June 30.
 A total lunar eclipse (descending node) on December 9.
 A partial solar eclipse (ascending node) on December 24.

Lunar year series

Half-Saros cycle
A lunar eclipse will be preceded and followed by solar eclipses by 9 years and 5.5 days (a half saros). This lunar eclipse is related to two total solar eclipses of Solar Saros 127.

Tritos series
 Preceded: Lunar eclipse of July 17, 1981
 Followed: Lunar eclipse of May 16, 2003

Tzolkinex 
 Preceded: Lunar eclipse of May 4, 1985
 Followed: Lunar eclipse of July 28, 1999

See also 
List of lunar eclipses
List of 20th-century lunar eclipses

References

External links 
Saros cycle 120

1992-06
1992 in science
June 1992 events